Francisco José Urrutia Olano (12 April 1870 – 6 August 1950) was a Colombian diplomat and international jurist. He served as Colombia's Minister of Foreign Affairs first from 1908 to 1909, and again from 1912 to 1914, during which he signed the Thomson–Urrutia Treaty, which re-established diplomatic relations between the United States and Colombia. He was Minister Plenipotentiary to the governments of Bolivia, Spain, Switzerland, and Permanent Representative to the League of Nations Assembly, holding the Presidency of the Executive Council in representation of Colombia in 1928. In 1931 he was elected to serve as Permanent Judge on the Permanent Court of International Justice at The Hague, where he served until 1942 when he resigned due to theonset of World War II.

Personal life
Francisco José Urrutia Olano was born on 12 April 1870 in Popayán, Colombia to Francisco de Paula Urrutia Ordoñez, Minister Plenipotentiary of Colombia in Quito, and Dolores Olano Hurtado. He married in Popayán on 24 June 1909 to Elena Holguín Arboleda, and together had four children: Francisco José (1910), María de la Paz (1911), Sofía (1912), and Carlos (1917).

Selected works

References

1870 births
1950 deaths
People from Cauca Department
Francisco Jose
20th-century Colombian judges
Ambassadors of Colombia to Ecuador
Permanent Representatives of Colombia to the League of Nations
Permanent Court of International Justice judges
Ambassadors of Colombia to Switzerland
Colombian judges of international courts and tribunals